John Angelos or Angelus may refer to:

 John Komnenos Doukas (died 1244), ruler of Thessalonica and Thessaly, referred to as John Angelos in earlier literature
 John Angelos (protostrator) (died 1258), favourite of Theodore II Laskaris
 John Angelos of Syrmia (died 1259), son of emperor Isaac II, exiled to Hungary where he became Duke of Syrmia
 John I Angelos (died 1289), ruler of Thessaly
 John Angelos (sebastokrator) (died 1348), Byzantine general and governor of Epirus and Thessaly
 John P. Angelos, Executive Vice President of the Baltimore Orioles

See also
John Angelo (disambiguation)